Kimagure Cook is a YouTube channel established in 2016 by Japanese YouTuber Kaneko, focused on cleaning, cutting, and cooking a wide variety of seafood with humorous narration from Kaneko.

Outline 

Kimagure Cook videos feature Kaneko preparing seafood with an emphasis on unusual or rare species, such as sharks, moray eels, giant squids, and seahorses. Before he prepares the seafood, he typically says his catchphrase .

While the scenes shown are often graphic, he usually does not depict the killing of live seafood.

After the seafood is prepared, he usually eats the dish together with an Asahi beer after saying his catchphrase , a reference to the silver color of the beer can.

His most popular videos have english subtitles and a wide international following.

Kaneko also operates a channel called  where he uploads a variety of videos both supplemental to and off-topic from his main channel, including a series on rare fruits.

Biography 
Kaneko was born in a fishing town near Ise Bay. Growing up, he learned about cooking, fishing, and seafood from his parents, who were chefs. He attended Nagoya Technical High School and entered the service industry. Currently, he is based in Chita Peninsula, Aichi Prefecture.

In 2016, he made his YouTube debut with a channel called  with a group of friends. In 2017, after quitting his job in the service industry, he began creating content regularly on his own channel to avoid saturating Nishiyan Fishing Club with his own videos.

Kaneko has a license to prepare Fugu from Aichi Prefecture.

In July 2020, Kaneko publicly announced his marriage on Twitter.

In June 2021, Kaneko left Kiii due to the resignation of the former president.

Kaneko announced in November 2021 that he and his wife celebrated the birth of their first child, and that he would be taking a break from YouTube to focus on raising his child. He returned to YouTube in January 2022, revealing that he would be moving to a new filming site.

References

External links
 
 
 
 Kimagure Cook's profile on Kiii
 
 

1991 births
Japanese Internet celebrities
Living people
People from Aichi Prefecture
Japanese YouTubers